Statistics of L. League in the 1997 season. Nikko Securities Dream Ladies won the championship.

First stage

Second stage

Championship playoff 
 Yomiuri-Seiyu Beleza 1-2 Nikko Securities Dream Ladies
Nikko Securities Dream Ladies won the championship.

League standings

League awards

Best player

Top scorers

Best eleven

Best young player

Promotion/relegation series

Division 1 promotion/relegation series 

 Takarazuka Bunnys Ladies SC stay Division 1 in 1998 Season.
 Mothers Kumamoto Rainbow Ladies stay Division 2 in 1998 Season.

See also 
 Empress's Cup

External links 
  Nadeshiko League Official Site

Nadeshiko League seasons
L
Japan
Japan
1997 in Japanese women's sport